Kazakhstani nationality law is governed by the Constitution of Kazakhstan and the Law on Citizenship (of 1991, with updates in 2002).

Dual citizenship
Dual citizenship is prohibited under the Kazakstani nationality law, and is grounds for refusal of nationality.

Acquisition

By descent
The law in Kazakhstan follows the principles of jus sanguinis. Birth to one Kazakhstani parent is permitted.

By naturalisation
Naturalisation procedure in Kazakhstan is 5 years of residence. However, this is reduced to 3 years of residency in the case of marriage to a Kazakhstani citizen.

Deprivation of nationality
In 2017, a new law was enacted to authorise the government to revoke nationality on the basis of terrorist or security based threats to the country

See also
Visa requirements for citizens of Kazakhstan
Kazakhstani passport

References

Nationality law
Law of Kazakhstan